Erik Johan Sæbø (born 14 December 1964) is a Norwegian former professional racing cyclist. He won the Norwegian National Road Race Championship in 1988. He also competed in the road race at the 1988 Summer Olympics.

References

External links
 

1964 births
Living people
Norwegian male cyclists
People from Sandnes
Cyclists at the 1988 Summer Olympics
Olympic cyclists of Norway
Sportspeople from Rogaland